Boscombe railway station was a station in Bournemouth, now in the county of Dorset, England (the station was located in Hampshire for the entirety of its existence). It was opened in 1897 at which time the previous station with the name was renamed Pokesdown. The station served the Royal Victoria Hospital and the centre of Boscombe around the Royal Arcade. It was also the closest station to Dean Court, the home of the football club known during the station's life as Bournemouth and Boscombe Athletic FC.
The station had a goods yard which received traffic from a large area of Bournemouth, and a large coal depot with sidings. It also had substantial brick buildings which were demolished a few years after closure. Closure took place, just before the electrification of the line through it, on 4 October 1965.

The site today
The area of the station yard is now occupied by a small industrial estate and the old coal yard awaits redevelopment. Trains on the South West Main Line pass the piles of gravel that are all that remain of the platforms. These can still be seen alongside the line from the bridge that carries the Ashley Road over the line just to the west of the site.

There have been calls for the re-opening of the station by the Dorset Area Rail Transport System, as well as by the Bournemouth Liberal Democrats. A major reported stumbling block to reopening is the substantial cost of installing lifts to the tracks and extending the platforms to accommodate 10-car trains.

References

Further reading 

 
 
 
 Station on navigable O.S. map

History of Dorset
Disused railway stations in Bournemouth
Former London and South Western Railway stations
Railway stations in Great Britain opened in 1897
Railway stations in Great Britain closed in 1965
1897 establishments in England
1965 disestablishments in England